The John Dickinson House, generally known as Poplar Hall, is located on the John Dickinson Plantation in Dover, a property owned by the State of Delaware and open to the public as a museum by the Delaware Division of Historical and Cultural Affairs and newly part of the First State National Historical Park. It was the boyhood home and sometime residence of the Founding Father and American revolutionary leader John Dickinson (1732-1808).

The main house is an Early Georgian mansion and was built on a  plantation in 1739–40 by Judge Samuel Dickinson, the father of John Dickinson. Wings were added in 1752 and 1754. The house faced a nearby bend of the St. Jones River which is no longer there as the river has been straightened. The original house suffered major damage during a British raid in August 1781 and was nearly destroyed in a fire in 1804. John Dickinson lived there for extended periods only in 1776–77 and 1781–82, although he kept up a keen interest in the property and often visited. Purchased by the National Society of Colonial Dames of America in 1952, it was given to the State of Delaware and declared a National Historic Landmark in 1961.

John Dickinson (1732–1808) was a lawyer and politician who spent most of the time in Philadelphia, Pennsylvania, and Wilmington, Delaware. He was at various times a Continental Congressman from Pennsylvania and Delaware, a delegate to the U.S. Constitutional Convention of 1787, President of Delaware, and President of Pennsylvania. Among the wealthiest men in the American colonies, he became known as the Penman of the Revolution, for his Letters from a Farmer in Pennsylvania, where he eloquently argued the cause of American liberty. Although refusing to vote in favor of the Declaration of Independence in 1776, he supported the establishment of the new government during the American Revolution and afterward in many official capacities.

References

External links
 John Dickinson Plantation
 

Houses completed in 1740
Houses on the National Register of Historic Places in Delaware
National Historic Landmarks in Delaware
Historic house museums in Delaware
Museums in Dover, Delaware
Georgian architecture in Delaware
Houses in Dover, Delaware
Historic American Buildings Survey in Delaware
National Register of Historic Places in Dover, Delaware
First State National Historical Park
1740 establishments in the Thirteen Colonies
Plantation houses in Delaware
Homes of United States Founding Fathers